Berberis valdiviana is a species of flowering plant in the barberry family Berberidaceae. It is an evergreen shrub from Chile, where it is locally known as cien or  espina en cruz. The Latin specific name valdiviana refers to the Valdivia Province of Chile. The flowers, which appear in May, are grouped in hanging racemes. It is grown as an ornamental plant, but is not suitable for colder regions.

References

valdiviana
Flora of Chile